2697 Albina, provisional designation , is a carbonaceous asteroid from the outer region of the asteroid belt, approximately 52 kilometers in diameter. It was discovered on 9 October 1969, by Russian astronomer Bella Burnasheva at the Crimean Astrophysical Observatory, Nauchnyj, on the Crimean peninsula. The asteroid was later named after Russian astronomer Albina Serova.

Orbit and classification 

Albina orbits the Sun in the outer main-belt at a distance of 3.3–3.8 AU once every 6 years and 9 months (2,455 days). Its orbit has an eccentricity of 0.08 and an inclination of 4° with respect to the ecliptic.

It first used observation was taken at Uccle Observatory in 1936, extending the body's observation arc by 33 years prior to its official discovery at Nauchnyj.

Physical characteristics 

Albina has been characterized as an X-type asteroid by Pan-STARRS photometric survey. It has also been dark described as a carbonaceous C-type asteroid in the Lightcurve Data Base.

Rotation period 

A rotational lightcurve of Albina was obtained from photometric observations made at the U.S. Palomar Transient Factory in October 2010. The lightcurve gave a rotation period of  hours with a brightness amplitude of 0.16 in magnitude, and supersedes a previous period of  hours from a fragmentary lightcurve, obtained by French astronomer Laurent Bernasconi in March 2006.

Diameter and albedo 

According to the space-based surveys carried out by the Infrared Astronomical Satellite (IRAS) and the Japanese Akari satellite, Albina has an albedo of 0.055 and 0.053, with a corresponding diameter of 51.5 and 52.7 kilometers, respectively. The Collaborative Asteroid Lightcurve Link derives a lower albedo of 0.039 and a diameter of 51.4 kilometers.

Naming 

This minor planet was named after Russian astronomer from Moscow, Albina Serova, who is a friend of the discoverer. The official naming citation was published by the Minor Planet Center on 18 September 1986.

References

External links 
 Asteroid Lightcurve Database (LCDB), query form (info )
 Dictionary of Minor Planet Names, Google books
 Asteroids and comets rotation curves, CdR – Observatoire de Genève, Raoul Behrend
 Discovery Circumstances: Numbered Minor Planets (1)-(5000) – Minor Planet Center
 
 

002697
002697
Discoveries by Bella A. Burnasheva
Named minor planets
19691009